Brad Pitt is an American actor and film producer who has received numerous awards and nominations, including two Academy Awards, a Primetime Emmy Award, two Golden Globe Awards, and a British Academy Film Award. He has been nominated for an additional five Academy Awards.

In 1994, Pitt starred as the vampire Louis de Pointe du Lac in the horror film Interview with the Vampire: The Vampire Chronicles, which earned him the MTV Movie Award for Most Desirable Male, and the MTV Movie Award for Best Actor in a Movie. The next year, Pitt appeared in Terry Gilliam's science fiction film 12 Monkeys, for which he won the Golden Globe Award for Best Supporting Actor – Motion Picture and earned his first Academy Awards nomination for Best Supporting Actor. In 2008, Pitt starred in the fantasy romantic drama The Curious Case of Benjamin Button. For his performance, he was nominated for his first Academy Award for Best Actor, his first BAFTA Award for Best Actor in a Leading Role nomination, Golden Globe Award for Best Actor – Motion Picture Drama, and Screen Actors Guild Award for Outstanding Performance by a Male Actor in a Leading Role. In 2011, Pitt produced and acted in biographical sports drama Moneyball. He was nominated for numerous accolades as an actor and producer including, Academy Award for Best Actor, BAFTA Award for Best Actor in a Leading Role, Golden Globe Award for Best Actor – Motion Picture Drama, and Screen Actors Guild Award for Outstanding Performance by a Male Actor in a Leading Role.

In 2013, Pitt produced and performed in biographical period-drama 12 Years a Slave. He portrayed Samuel Bass, a Canadian laborer who expresses his opposition to slavery. Pitt won Screen Actors Guild Award for Outstanding Performance by a Cast in a Motion Picture. In 2019, Pitt starred in Quentin Tarantino's comedy-drama Once Upon a Time in Hollywood. He won the Academy Award for Best Supporting Actor, AACTA International Award for Best Supporting Actor, Golden Globe Award for Best Supporting Actor – Motion Picture, and Screen Actors Guild Award for Outstanding Performance by a Cast in a Motion Picture.

Major associations

Academy Awards

British Academy Film Awards

Golden Globe Awards

Primetime Emmy Awards

Screen Actors Guild Awards

Miscellaneous awards

Notes

References

See also 
 Brad Pitt filmography

External links 
 

Pitt, Brad
Awards